Bourton is a village and civil parish in north Dorset, England, situated north of the A303 road on the border with Somerset and Wiltshire between Mere and Wincanton. The parish is the most northerly in Dorset and in the 2011 census had a population of 822. Bourton is the most populous village in the electoral ward called Bourton and District. The District extends to Silton then south to Buckhorn Weston and Kington Magna. The total ward population at the abovementioned census was 1,905.  The village lies on the River Stour which passes through the historic Bourton Mill, once home to the second largest water wheel in Britain ( in diameter) .

The village has two stores, a petrol station and a public house. The White Lion Inn stands on the High Street, which leads off what was the old main London to Exeter road before the village was bypassed to the south in 1992 by the A303. St George’s Church, which stands on one of the highest points in the village, was built via public subscription in 1810 and borders the primary school of the same name.

The point at which the counties of Dorset, Somerset and Wiltshire meet beside the lake at the rear of Bourton Mill is marked by Egbert's Stone which once fell into the River Stour, but was rescued and re-erected. In 878 it formed the rallying point for Alfred the Great's troops before the Battle of Ethandun. His grandfather, Egbert of Wessex, was said to have placed the stone there to settle the shire boundaries. Just over the county border is King Alfred's Tower.

The mill, which is mentioned in the Domesday book, has had many incarnations. As a linen mill it processed flax and supplied canvas to the Royal Navy but when industry declined it was developed into a foundry with a blast furnace and was one of the first places to make the new threshing machines in the West of England. It went on to build boilers, steam lorries and gas engines as well as gaining a reputation as a builder of water wheels. During the First World War Mills Bombs were produced here in vast quantities. After the Gasper dam burst upriver in the summer of 1917, much of the machinery was washed from the factory and it took a number of years for industry to restart on the site. When it did return in 1933 the factory entered its final phase as a dried milk processing plant and this continued up until its closure in 1998. It has now been demolished to make way for the Mill Lake development. 

Chaffeymoor Lodge, located in an Area of Outstanding Natural Beauty at Chaffeymoor, is a large 17th-century house which retains original features including stone mullioned windows, large fireplaces and exposed beams. The extensive grounds include mature gardens, an ornamental pond, a croquet lawn and a lake, are recommended by The Royal Horticultural Society.

The nearest railway station is in neighbouring Gillingham. Trains run on the Exeter to Waterloo line.

References

External links

Villages in Dorset
Civil parishes in Dorset